The Thulin E was a Swedish reconnaissance aircraft built in the late 1910s.

Design and development
The Thulin E was the first indigenous design conceived by Enoch Thulin's company. It was a two-seat biplane with the lower wings mounted at the bottom of the fuselage. The upper wing was supported by four wing struts and four V-shaped fuselage struts. Only the upper wings were fitted with ailerons. The fuselage was provided with two open cockpits, in tandem, under the upper wing. The rear landing gear was a fixed spur spring. An attempt was made to equip the biplane with floats.

Specifications

See also

References

Biplanes
Single-engined tractor aircraft
1910s Swedish aircraft
Aircraft first flown in 1916